144,000 is a natural number. It has significance in various religious movements and ancient prophetic belief systems.

Religion

Christianity

Book of Revelation
The number 144,000 appears three times in the Book of Revelation:
 Revelation 7:3–8:

 Revelation 14:1:

 Revelation 14:3–5:

The numbers 12,000 and 144,000 are variously interpreted in traditional Christianity. Some, taking the numbers in Revelation to be symbolic, believe it represents all of God's people throughout history in the heavenly Church. One suggestion is that the number comes from 12, a symbol for totality, which is squared and multiplied by one thousand for more emphasis. Others insist the numbers 12,000 and 144,000 are literal numbers and representing either descendants of Jacob (also called Israel in the Bible) or others to whom God has given a superior destiny with a distinct role at the time of the end of the world. One understanding is that the 144,000 are recently converted Jewish evangelists sent out to bring sinners to Jesus Christ during the seven year tribulation period. Preterists believe they are Jewish Christians, sealed for deliverance from the destruction of Jerusalem in 70 A.D. Dispensationalist Tim LaHaye, in his commentary Revelation: Illustrated and Made Plain (Zondervan, 1975), considers the 144,000 in Revelation 7 to refer to Jews and those in Revelation 14 to refer to Christians.

Jehovah's Witnesses

Jehovah's Witnesses believe that exactly 144,000 faithful Christians from Pentecost of 33 AD until the present day will be resurrected to heaven as immortal spirit beings to spend eternity with God and Christ. They believe that these people are "anointed" by God to become part of the spiritual "Israel of God". They believe the 144,000 (which they consider to be synonymous with the "little flock" of Luke 12:32) will serve with Christ as king-priests for a thousand years, while all other people accepted by God (the "other sheep" of John 10:16, composed of "the great crowd" of Revelation 7:9,14 and the resurrected "righteous and the unrighteous" ones of Acts 24:15), will be given an opportunity to live forever in a restored paradise on earth.

Individual Witnesses indicate their claim of being "anointed" by partaking of the bread and wine at the annual Memorial of Christ's death. More than 21,000 Witnesses worldwide—an increase of over 12,000 since 1995—claim to be of the anointed "remnant" of the 144,000. The members of the Governing Body who exercise teaching authority over Jehovah's Witnesses worldwide claim to be among the anointed 144,000, and also consider themselves as a group to be the faithful and discreet slave of Matthew 24:45 and Luke 12:42.

The Church of Jesus Christ of Latter-day Saints
The Church of Jesus Christ of Latter-day Saints believes that the sealing of the 144,000 relates to the high priests, ordained unto the holy order of God, to administer the everlasting gospel; "for they are they who are ordained out of every nation, kindred, tongue, and people, by the angels to whom is given power over the nations of the earth, to bring as many as will come to the church of the Firstborn."

Skoptzists
The Christian Skoptsy sect in Russia believed that the Messiah would come when there were 144,000  Skoptsy believers, based on their reading of the Book of Revelation.

Unification Church
The Unification Church founded by Reverend Sun Myung Moon believes the 144,000 represents the total number of saints whom Christ must find "who can restore through indemnity the missions of all the past saints who, despite their best efforts to do God's Will, fell prey to Satan when they failed in their responsibilities.  He must find these people during his lifetime and lay the foundation of victory over Satan's world".

Islam
144,000 is alleged to have been the number of Sahaba of Muhammad, though other totals have been given. The number is also given as the total number of prophets in Islam, although this has also been reported as 124,000 or 244,000. The actual number of prophets or Sahaba (Companions) is not known; about 30 prophets are mentioned by name in the Qur'an.

Other uses
Coptic sources calculate the number of Holy Innocents massacred to have been 144,000.
 A Baktun is 20 Katun cycles of the ancient Maya Long Count calendar, which contains 144,000 days.

References

Beliefs and practices of Jehovah's Witnesses
Book of Revelation
Judgment in Christianity
Integers
Numerology